Chyżne  is a village in the administrative district of Gmina Jabłonka, within Nowy Targ County, Lesser Poland Voivodeship, in southern Poland, close to the border with Slovakia. The village has a population of 1,200.

The village lies in the drainage basin of the Black Sea (through Orava, Váh and Danube rivers), in the historical region of Orava (Polish: Orawa).

History
The area became part of Poland in the 10th or early 11th century, and later it passed to Hungary. In the late 19th century, Chyżne had a population of 1,728, 86.9% Polish. It became again part of Poland following World War I.

References

Villages in Nowy Targ County